Singapore Standard (SS) specifies the standards used for industrial activities in Singapore. The standardization process is coordinated by Singapore Standards Council, administered by Enterprise Singapore, a Governmental body.

History
The Singapore Standards Council was initially administered by SPRING Singapore. This role was superseded by Enterprise Singapore in 2018 after the merger of SPRING Singapore with International Enterprise Singapore.

Development 
As the national standards body, Enterprise Singapore administers the Singapore Standardisation Programme through an industry-led Singapore Standards Council. The Council approves the establishment, review and withdrawal of Singapore Standards and Technical References. It also advises Enterprise Singapore on the policies, strategies, initiatives and procedures for standards development and promotion.

Standards are developed primarily through:
 Adoption of international standards (e.g., ISO 9001 reissued as SS ISO 9001 - Quality management systems – Requirements)
 Development, with inputs from industry, to meet specific needs of the local economy (e.g.  SS 631 - Specification for metal roofing system)

Singapore Standards are nationally recognized documents, established by consensus. They are functional or technical requirements in the form of specifications for materials, product system or process, codes of practice, methods of test, terminologies and guides.

Technical References (TR) are transition documents developed to help meet urgent industry demand on a particular product, process or service in an area where reference standards are not available. Unlike Singapore Standards, TRs are not gazetted and are issued without the consensus process. They are prestandards 'tested' over two years before assessment on their suitability for approval as Singapore Standards. TRs can, therefore, become Singapore Standards after two years, continue as Technical References for further comments, or be withdrawn.

List of Standards

The following list is incomplete, and based on the best-selling standards of 2018 by the eShop.

References

Standards organisations in Singapore
Standards organizations